Hooded Menace are a Finnish death-doom band formed in Joensuu in 2007 by guitarist Lasse Pyykkö, who had previously performed in a  death metal band named Phlegethon.

History

The band kickstarted their career by recording a two-track demo titled The Eyeless Horde in 2007, which was released on 7" vinyl the following year. The band released their debut album, Fulfill the Curse, in 2008; followed by the highly acclaimed sophomore full-length album, Never Cross the Dead, in 2010.

The band continued to record and release albums, with their third full-length album, Effigies of Evil, released in 2012; followed by Darkness Drips Forth in 2015. The band have also released several split albums and EPs, with bands such as Asphyx.

The band have also toured in Europe and North America, performing at many major metal festivals such as Hellfest, Roadburn, Maryland Deathfest, Tuska, and Party San Open Air among others.

The band released their fifth studio album, titled Ossuarium Silhouettes Unhallowed, in 2018.

Musical style and influences 

The band play a hybrid genre of music known as death-doom, which blends elements of death metal and doom metal, claiming influence from bands such as Candlemass, Cathedral, Paradise Lost, Asphyx and Winter, among others. The band's lyrics tend to revolve around horror stories, especially those within horror movies including The Blind Dead.

Members

Current members 
 Lasse Pyykkö – guitar (2007–present) bass (2010–2012, 2018–present) vocals (2010–2016)
 Pekka Koskelo – drums (2009–2010, 2011–2017, 2018-present)
 Teemu Hannonen – guitar (2012–present)
 Harri Kuokkanen – vocals (2016–present)

Former members 
 Jori Sara-Aho – bass (2010) drums (2010–2011)
 Antti Salminen – bass (2010–2011)
 Oula Kerkelä – vocals (2010–2011)
 Markus Makkonen – bass,vocals (2012–2016)
 Antti Poutanen – bass (2017–2018)
 Otso Ukkonen – drums (2017–2018)

Timeline

Discography 
Studio albums
 Fulfill the Curse (2008)
 Never Cross the Dead (2010)
 Effigies of Evil (2012)
 Darkness Drips Forth (2015)
 Ossuarium Silhouettes Unhallowed (2018)
 The Tritonus Bell (2021)

Demos
 The Eyeless Horde (2007)

Compilations
 Gloom Immemorial (2015)

Split albums and EPs
 Hooded Menace/Anima Morte (2010)
 Hooded Meance/Coffins (2010)
 Asphyx/Hooded Menace (2011)
 Hooded Menace/Ilsa (2011)
 Necrotic Monuments (2012)
 Hooded Menace/Horse Latitudes (2012)
 Labyrinth of Carrion Breeze (2014)
 A View from the Rope (2014)
 Hooded Menace/Algoma (2017)

References 

Season of Mist artists
Relapse Records artists
Profound Lore Records albums
Doom metal musical groups
Finnish heavy metal musical groups
Finnish death metal musical groups